Dmitry Reiherd (born 8 January 1989 in Oskemen) is a Kazakh freestyle skier, specializing in  moguls.

Reiherd competed at the 2006 and 2010 Winter Olympics for Kazakhstan. His best performance came in 2010, when he qualified for the moguls final, finishing 18th. In 2006, he finished 33rd in the qualifying round, and did not advance.

As of February 2013, his best showing at the World Championships came in 2009, placing 15th in the moguls event.

Reiherd made his World Cup debut in February 2005. As of February 2013, he has won one World Cup event, a Dual Moguls competition at Åre in 2007/08. This result included defeating 2006 Olympic moguls champion Dale Begg-Smith in the final. Altogether, he has four World Cup medals, his first medal also coming at Åre, a day before his first victory. His best World Cup finish is 10th, in 2007/08.

World Cup Podiums

References

1989 births
Living people
Kazakhstani male freestyle skiers
Olympic freestyle skiers of Kazakhstan
Freestyle skiers at the 2006 Winter Olympics
Freestyle skiers at the 2010 Winter Olympics
Freestyle skiers at the 2014 Winter Olympics
Freestyle skiers at the 2018 Winter Olympics
Freestyle skiers at the 2022 Winter Olympics
Sportspeople from Oskemen
Kazakhstani people of German descent
Asian Games medalists in freestyle skiing
Freestyle skiers at the 2011 Asian Winter Games
Freestyle skiers at the 2017 Asian Winter Games
Asian Games gold medalists for Kazakhstan
Asian Games bronze medalists for Kazakhstan
Medalists at the 2011 Asian Winter Games
Medalists at the 2017 Asian Winter Games
Universiade medalists in freestyle skiing
Universiade gold medalists for Kazakhstan
Universiade silver medalists for Kazakhstan
Competitors at the 2015 Winter Universiade
Competitors at the 2017 Winter Universiade